The Chico Mendes Institute for Biodiversity Conservation (Portuguese: Instituto Chico Mendes de Conservação da Biodiversidade, ICMBio) is the Brazilian Ministry of the Environment's administrative arm. It is named after the environmental activist Chico Mendes.

References

Nature conservation in Brazil
Executive branch of Brazil
Research institutes in Brazil
Biodiversity databases
Government agencies established in 2007
Environmental organizations established in 2007
2007 establishments in Brazil